Quicksand, originally published in Japan as , is a novel by the Japanese author Jun'ichirō Tanizaki. It was written in serial format between 1928 and 1930 for the magazine Kaizō. The last of Tanizaki's major novels translated into English, it concerns a four-way bisexual love affair between upper-crust denizens of Osaka.

Title
The Japanese title, Manji, refers to the four-pronged Buddhist swastika, a symbol of the four lovers. The English title refers to the destructive cycle of obsession and jealousy faced by the four main characters.

Plot
The story is narrated by Sonoko Kakiuchi, a young woman from Osaka. At the start of the novel she lives comfortably with her husband Kotaro, and attends art classes at a local women's school. Rumors spread around the school that Sonoko is having a lesbian affair with another student, the beautiful young Mitsuko. Sonoko finds herself drawn to Mitsuko, though she barely knows her, and she proceeds to forge a friendship with her. Soon, she invites Mitsuko to her house to pose nude for her figure drawing. Mitsuko agrees, but insists on covering herself with a sheet. The sexual tension comes to a head when Sonoko rips the sheet away, thus sealing her infatuation. The two begin a fiery affair.

Things are complicated by the arrival of Watanuki Eijiro, Mitsuko's sometime fiance. The effeminate, impotent Watanuki reveals that Mitsuko had intended to marry him, but now refuses unless he allows her affair with Sonoko to continue. Sonoko begins to sense that Mitsuko has been manipulating them both, but is far too mired in her infatuation – the quicksand of the title – to back out. Meanwhile, Sonoko's husband Kotaro has taken notice of her infatuation with Mitsuko. He attempts to put an end to it, but Sonoko will not be dissuaded. After a few chance meetings, Kotaro falls under Mitsuko's spell as well, and attempts to get closer to her. One evening when all three are sleeping in bed together, Sonoko awakens to find Kotaro having intercourse with Mitsuko. Knowing that their ménage à trois is doomed, Sonoko, Kotaro, and Mitsuko form a suicide pact, in which they will kill themselves with poison-laced sleeping powder. In the event, however, Sonoko wakes up, realizing that Kotaro and Mitsuko have withheld the poison from her dose, a final betrayal.

Development history
The novel was first published serially in the magazine Kaizō between 1928 and 1930. An English translation by Howard Hibbett was published in 1994 by Alfred A. Knopf.

Adaptations
The novel has been adapted to film several times. The first was the 1964 film Manji, directed by Yasuzo Masumura, written by Kaneto Shindo and starring Ayako Wakao and Kyōko Kishida. The film was remade in 1983 and 2006. In 1985 the novel was adapted into the Italo-German film The Berlin Affair, which changed the setting to Nazi Germany. There was also a 1984 PC-88 game by CSK Research Institute based on it.

References

1928 novels
Novels with lesbian themes
Novels by Junichiro Tanizaki
Works originally published in Kaizō
Japanese serial novels
Novels set in Osaka
Japanese novels adapted into films
Japanese LGBT novels
1920s LGBT novels